Northlake Mall may refer to:
Northlake Mall (Atlanta)
Northlake Mall (Charlotte, North Carolina)